Jack Move is a 2022 role playing video game developed by So Romantic and published by HypeTrain Digital.

Gameplay
Jack Move is a single player turn based role playing game. The combat system of the game is based around strategic use of three different elements.

Development
Development of the game started in 2012, with the creation of a battle system. According to a 2021 interview in Wireframe Magazine, game was developed in the Unity game engine, making use of 3D environments in conjunction with a forced perspective, video post-processing and other artistic techniques to create the illusion of a 2D overworld. The game was influenced by Golden Sun and the Final Fantasy series, as well as by elements of the film Hackers.

A public demo was released on Steam during the 2021 Steam Summer Festival. In August 2022 an animated trailer was released.

The Microsoft Windows and MacOS versions launched on September 8, 2022, with console versions for Nintendo Switch, Xbox One, and PlayStation 4 following on September 20, 2022.

Reception

Jack Move received "generally favorable" reviews based on five critics on the review aggregator website Metacritic.

A number of reviews noted the shortness of the game, often noting that the game took only a few hours but was very impactful during that time.

References

2022 video games
Indie video games
Role-playing video games
Video games featuring female protagonists
Windows games
macOS games
PlayStation 4 games
Nintendo Switch games
Xbox One games
Cyberpunk video games
Dystopian video games
Video games developed in the United Kingdom
Video games developed in Taiwan